Parheminodes is a genus of leaf beetles in the subfamily Eumolpinae. It is distributed in the Oriental realm. In 2021, nearly all species of Chrysochus from the tropics were transferred to this genus.

Species
There are at least seven species included in the genus:
 Parheminodes collaris Chen, 1940 – China (Hainan, Yunnan)
 Parheminodes conspectus (Lefèvre, 1890) – Laos
 Parheminodes hageni (Jacoby, 1884) – Sumatra
 Parheminodes massiei (Lefèvre, 1893) – Laos
 Parheminodes mouhoti (Baly, 1864) – Thailand, Laos, Vietnam
 Parheminodes nilgiriensis (Jacoby, 1908) – South India
 Parheminodes pulcher (Baly, 1864) – Peninsular Malaysia

References

Eumolpinae
Chrysomelidae genera
Beetles of Asia